Alyona Polunina (born December 31, 1975) is a Russian independent filmmaker.

Biography
Alyona Polunina was born in Tuapse.  In 2002, she won an educational grant and enrolled in a school for script writers and producers in Moscow. She graduated from the school in 2004.

Now she's working in the Russian film industry.

Filmography
 Yes, Death (2004)
 Viva la Muerte (2004), Director, Writer, Producer, Cinematographer
 One of the Cases of Bird Flu (2005)
 Sacrum (2005)
 Festival (2007)
 The Revolution That Wasn't (2008), Director, Editor, Writer
 Nepal Forever (2013), Director, Writer, Editor
 Varya (2014), Director
 Their Own Republic (2018), Director

References

External links
 
 Interview with Polunina
 Alyona Polunina

1975 births
Russian film directors
Russian women film directors
Russian screenwriters
Living people